Captain William Cayley (5 May 1742 – 3 January 1801) was a British Royal Navy officer.

Family and early life 
William Cayley was the fourth son of Sir George Cayley (1707-1791), the fourth of the Cayley baronets. He was christened at St Michael le Belfrey, York on 5 May 1742.

Naval career 

William Cayley was commissioned a lieutenant in 1762.

In 1794 he was captain of the newly commissioned . The following year he commissioned HMS Juste, a captured French ship, and commanded her for two months. Over the next few years he escorted convoys and engaged in various battles with the French. In May 1796 he captured Alexandre off Madeira, and freed the Portuguese ship Signior Montcalm, which Alexandre had previously captured. In December that year he was involved in an attack on the French fleet off Dominica. In 1797 he was present when Trinidad was surrendered to the British. In 1799 he was in the British fleet that received the surrender of Suriname.

Death 
He died at Chatham, Kent on 3 January 1801.

References

External links 
 William Cayley (1742–1801)
 Cayley Family History website

William
1742 births
1801 deaths
Royal Navy officers